Ampelion is a genus of passerine birds in the family Cotingidae. 
It contains the following species:

References

 
Cotingidae
Bird genera
Taxonomy articles created by Polbot